PAWA Dominicana  (legally Pan Am World Airways Dominicana) was the international flag carrier of the Dominican Republic. It was created as a subsidiary airline for Pan American Airways. This airline had scheduled flights between Santo Domingo and other Caribbean and US destinations. It was based at Santo Domingo-Las Americas.

Authority for several international routes was suspended January 28, 2018. As of February 2018, the airline has ceased all of its operations. The airline's failure would be the first test of the nation's new bankruptcy law.

History
PAWA Dominicana was created in 2003 as a subsidiary of Pan American Airways, which had also operated within a strategic alliance with Boston-Maine Airways. In April 2005, Servair, a Dominican Corporation dedicated to offering services to airlines in all airports in the Dominican Republic, acquired the airline completely and began a new certification process within the framework of the new Dominican regulations, which allowed the company to operate under local control.

In May 2007, the company received the Air Operator Certificate Part 121 from the Dominican Institute of Civil Aviation (IDAC), which allows the airline to operate regular services from the Dominican Republic to North, Central and South America, as well as the Caribbean region and charter services around the world. The first flight took place on October 1, 2007.

On June 4, 2010, the company was purchased by a group of airline professionals and they appointed Mrs. Mirtha Espada as the company's president.

In February 2012, the airline temporarily ceased scheduled services but continued operating charter services. In March 2012 the company appointed Hector Gomez as president with the task of re-orienting the company and also calling back the former company's founder and owner as a part of the organization.

The airline secured its air operator certificate in mid-October 2014 and started services using 4 McDonnell Douglas MD-80s. The first flight took place on August 14, 2015.

On January 26, 2018, PAWA was suspended under the allegation of non-payment, since they owed more than $3 Million to the Dominican authorities, among them, the Civil Aviation Board, the Dominican Institute of Civil Aviation and the Dominican Airport's company 21st Century. Due to this, the JAC suspended the airline for 90 days and was not allowed to travel, therefore it had generated many complaints with passengers who are stranded in air terminals. On February 2, 2018, a new element was added due to the suspension and that is the lack of maintenance to the airline's fleet. PAWA's related Venezuelan airline, SBA Airlines was also suspended by his country's authorities on the same day and for similar reasons in April of the same year. The company closed legally in August 6, 2019 by the authority of Dominican aviation IDAC.

Operations
PAWA Dominicana authority included international charter services and scheduled services to Antigua, Aruba, Curaçao, Havana, San Juan, and St. Maarten from their Santo Domingo hub with several flights a week on the MD-80 and DC-9.

PAWA was working to consolidate flights to New York and Miami (service started Nov. 2016) and other Caribbean Islands. The company's goal was stated as "to make SDQ the HUB of the Caribbean." In the future, PAWA would have planned flights from Santiago and Punta Cana to Miami, New York, and San Juan.

Destinations
As of January 28, 2018, PAWA Dominicana served the following destinations:

Codeshare agreements
PAWA had codeshare agreements with the following airlines:
Aserca Airlines
Air Europa

Fleet

Final fleet

As of August 2017, the fleet of PAWA Dominicana consisted of the following aircraft:

Former fleet
PAWA Dominicana formerly operated the following types:

See also
Aserca Airlines
List of defunct airlines of the Dominican Republic
SBA Airlines

References

Junta de Aviación Civil de la República Dominicana (JAC).
Instituto Dominicano de Aviación Civil de la República Dominicana (IDAC).

External links

PAWA Dominicana official website (out of order)

Pan Am
Defunct airlines of the Dominican Republic
Airlines established in 2003
Airlines disestablished in 2018
2003 establishments in the Dominican Republic
2018 disestablishments in the Dominican Republic